The Fläschenspitz is a mountain of the Glarus Alps, located south of Studen in the canton of Schwyz. It lies between the valley of the Sihl and the Klöntal.

References

External links
Fläschenspitz on Hikr

Mountains of the Alps
Mountains of the canton of Schwyz
Mountains of Switzerland